Euphorbia alsiniflora , is a species of flowering plant, belonging to the family Euphorbiaceae. It is native to Australia in the Northern Territory and Queensland .

In Kew, it is considered a synonym for Euphorbia filipes Benth., Fl. Austral. 6:51 (1873).

Taxonomy 
Euphorbia alsiniflora was described by Henri Ernest Baillon and published in Adansonia 6: 288. 1866. 

Euphorbia is generic name that derives from the Greek physician of King Juba II of Mauritania (52 to 50 BC - 23 ), Euphorbus, in his honor - or in allusion to his large belly - since he used Euphorbia resinifera medically. In 1753 Carl Linnaeus assigned the name to the entire genus. 

alsiniflora is a Latin epithet that means "with the flowers of Alsine ".

References 

alsiniflora